Barbra Banda (born 20 March 2000) is a Zambian amateur boxer and footballer who plays as a forward for Chinese club Shanghai Shengli and the Zambia women's national team. She captains the Zambia women's national football team.

Early life 
Banda was born in March 2000 in Lusaka, the Zambian capital. She began playing football at the age of seven.

Club career
After spending her two first seasons at Spanish first division club EDF Logroño, in January 2020, Banda was transferred to Chinese Super League club Shanghai Shengli.

In her debut season, she scored 18 goals in 13 league matches to emerge as the 2020 Chinese Women's Super League top scorer.

International career

Junior 
Banda represented the Zambia women's national under-17 football team in the 2014 FIFA U-17 Women's World Cup.

Senior 
In Zambia's first group stage match at the 2020 Olympics, Banda scored a hat trick against the Netherlands. The match ended 3–10, the worst ever loss for the Zambia women's national football team and the highest-scoring women's football match in Olympics history. In their second group match, Banda scored another hat trick against China with the match ending in a 4–4 draw. She became the first female player in Olympics history to score back-to-back hat tricks and the first to score two hat tricks in one tournament.

On July 6, 2022, Banda was ruled ineligible to compete for Zambia in the Women's Africa Cup of Nations tournament after a gender verification test found that her natural testosterone levels were above those allowed by the Confederation of African Football, which has stricter gender verification rules than the Olympics. The ruling sparked significant controversy, with Human Rights Watch describing it as a "clear violation" of her human rights.

International goals
Scores and results list Zambia's goal tally first

Honours 
Individual
 Chinese Women's Super League Top scorer: 2020

References

External links
Profile at Txapeldunak.com 

2000 births
Living people
Women's association football forwards
Zambian women's footballers
Sportspeople from Lusaka
Zambia women's international footballers
EdF Logroño players
Primera División (women) players
Chinese Women's Super League players
Zambian expatriate footballers
Zambian expatriate sportspeople in Spain
Zambian expatriate sportspeople in China
Expatriate women's footballers in Spain
Expatriate women's footballers in China
Footballers at the 2020 Summer Olympics
Olympic footballers of Zambia